The 18th Washington D.C. Area Film Critics Association Awards were announced on December 8, 2019.

Winners and nominees

Best Film
 Parasite
 1917
 The Irishman
 Marriage Story
 Once Upon a Time in Hollywood

Best Director
 Bong Joon-ho – Parasite
 Greta Gerwig – Little Women
 Sam Mendes – 1917
 Martin Scorsese – The Irishman
 Quentin Tarantino – Once Upon a Time in Hollywood

Best Actor
 Adam Driver – Marriage Story
 Robert De Niro – The Irishman
 Leonardo DiCaprio – Once Upon a Time in Hollywood
 Joaquin Phoenix – Joker
 Adam Sandler – Uncut Gems

Best Actress
 Lupita Nyong'o – Us
 Awkwafina – The Farewell
 Scarlett Johansson – Marriage Story
 Saoirse Ronan – Little Women
 Renée Zellweger – Judy

Best Supporting Actor
 Brad Pitt – Once Upon a Time in Hollywood
 Tom Hanks – A Beautiful Day in the Neighborhood
 Jonathan Majors – The Last Black Man in San Francisco
 Al Pacino – The Irishman
 Joe Pesci – The Irishman

Best Supporting Actress
 Jennifer Lopez – Hustlers
 Laura Dern – Marriage Story
 Scarlett Johansson – Jojo Rabbit
 Florence Pugh – Little Women
 Zhao Shu-zhen – The Farewell

Best Original Screenplay
 Noah Baumbach – Marriage Story
 Rian Johnson – Knives Out
 Bong Joon-ho and Han Jin-won – Parasite
 Jordan Peele – Us
 Quentin Tarantino – Once Upon a Time in Hollywood

Best Adapted Screenplay
 Greta Gerwig – Little Women (based on the novel by Louisa May Alcott)
 Micah Fitzerman-Blue and Noah Harpster – A Beautiful Day in the Neighborhood (inspired by the article "Can You Say ... Hero?" by Tom Junod)
 Todd Phillips and Scott Silver – Joker (based on characters created by Bill Finger, Bob Kane, and Jerry Robinson)
 Taika Waititi – Jojo Rabbit (based on the book Caging Skies by Christine Leunens)
 Steven Zaillian – The Irishman (based on the book I Heard You Paint Houses by Charles Brandt)

Best Animated Feature
 Toy Story 4
 Frozen II
 How to Train Your Dragon: The Hidden World
 Klaus
 Missing Link

Best Documentary Film
 Apollo 11
 American Factory
 For Sama
 Honeyland
 One Child Nation

Best Foreign Language Film
 Parasite • South Korea Atlantics • Senegal
 Monos • Colombia
 Pain and Glory • Spain
 Portrait of a Lady on Fire • FranceBest Cinematography Roger Deakins – 1917
 Jarin Blaschke – The Lighthouse
 Drew Daniels – Waves
 Rodrigo Prieto – The Irishman
 Robert Richardson – Once Upon a Time in Hollywood

Best Editing
 Andrew Buckland and Michael McCusker – Ford v Ferrari
 Yang Jin-mo – Parasite
 Fred Raskin– Once Upon a Time in Hollywood
 Thelma Schoonmaker – The Irishman
 Lee Smith – 1917

Best Original Score
 Michael Abels – Us
 Alexandre Desplat – Little Women
 Hildur Guðnadóttir – Joker
 Randy Newman – Marriage Story
 Thomas Newman – 1917

Best Production Design
 Barbara Ling (production design) and Nancy Haigh (set decoration) – Once Upon a Time in Hollywood
 Dennis Gassner (production design) and Lee Sandales (set decoration) – 1917
 Jess Gonchor (production design) and Claire Kaufman (set decoration) – Little Women
 Lee Ha-jun (production design) and Cho Won-woo (set decoration) – Parasite
 Ra Vincent (production design) and Nora Sopková (set decoration) – Jojo Rabbit

Best Acting Ensemble
 Knives Out
 The Irishman
 Little Women
 Once Upon a Time in Hollywood
 Parasite

Best Youth Performance
 Roman Griffin Davis – Jojo Rabbit
 Julia Butters – Once Upon a Time in Hollywood
 Shahadi Wright Joseph – Us
 Noah Jupe – Honey Boy
 Thomasin McKenzie – Jojo Rabbit

Best Voice Performance
 Tony Hale – Toy Story 4
 Kristen Bell – Frozen II
 Billy Eichner – The Lion King
 Tom Hanks – Toy Story 4
 Annie Potts  – Toy Story 4

Best Motion Capture Performance
 Josh Brolin – Avengers: Endgame
 Rosa Salazar – Alita: Battle Angel

The Joe Barber Award for Best Portrayal of Washington, D.C.
 The Report
 Long Shot

Multiple nominations and wins

The following films received multiple nominations:

The following films received multiple awards:

References

External links
 The Washington D.C. Area Film Critics Association

2019
2019 film awards